Eric, Erik, or Erick Anderson may refer to:

Sports
 Eric Anderson (English footballer) (1931–1990), English footballer for Liverpool
 Eric Anderson (rugby union) (1931–2014), New Zealand rugby union player
 Erick Anderson (born 1968), American football player
 Eric Anderson (basketball, born 1970) (1970–2018), American NBA basketball player
 Erik Anderson (ice hockey) (born 1978), American ice hockey player
 Eric Anderson (basketball, born 1993), American basketball player

Others
 Eric O. Anderson (1905–1980), American politician, member of the Washington House of Representatives
 Eric Anderson (VC) (1915–1943), English soldier, recipient of the Victoria Cross
 Eric Anderson (teacher) (1936–2020), British educator
 Eric Anderson (politician) (born 1956), American politician, Idaho State Representative
 Eric Anderson (sociologist) (born 1968), American sociologist
 Eric Anderson (actor) (born 1972), American actor
 Eric Chase Anderson (born 1973), American writer and illustrator
 Eric C. Anderson (born 1974), American entrepreneur and aerospace engineer

See also
 Eric Andersen (disambiguation)
 Erik Andersen (disambiguation)
 Erik Andersson (disambiguation)